Bill Campbell (3 December 1904 – 19 March 2007) was an Australian rules footballer who played for the North Melbourne Football Club in the Victorian Football League (VFL).  He was the fourth ex-VFL player to live to be more than 100 years old.

Campbell grew up in Whipstick Gully, north of Bendigo and played for Huntly Football Club.  He was a member of their 1925 premiership team in the Neilborough District Football Association.

References

External links

1904 births
2007 deaths
Australian rules footballers from Victoria (Australia)
North Melbourne Football Club players
Australian centenarians
Men centenarians